Antun Banek (27 April 1901 – 18 March 1987) was a Yugoslav cyclist. He competed in the individual and team road race events at the 1928 Summer Olympics.

References

External links
 

1901 births
1987 deaths
Yugoslav male cyclists
Olympic cyclists of Yugoslavia
Cyclists at the 1928 Summer Olympics
Place of birth missing